Katharine Worth (4 August 192228 January 2015) was a British academic,  Professor of Drama at Royal Holloway, University of London.

Biography

Early life and education
Katherine Joyce Worth (née Lorimer) was born in Newcastle upon Tyne  on 4 August 1922 to George and Elizabeth Lorimer. The family later moved to Newbiggin-by-the-Sea and Whitley Bay, Northumberland, where she grew up. She was successful in obtaining a scholarship to Bedlington High School but left to sit the Civil Service entry exam when she was sixteen years-old. She obtained a BA in English through a correspondence course with the University of London whilst employed as a junior civil servant. She went on to Bedford College, University of London where she wrote a dissertation on George Bernard Shaw for her Masters in Research, followed by a doctoral thesis on American playwright and Nobel laureate Eugene O’Neill for her PhD, under the supervision of Una Ellis-Fermor the College's then Hildred Carlile Professor of English.

Career
Worth initially lectured for the University of London department of Extra-Mural Studies and for the Central School of Speech and Drama.  In 1964 she was appointed lecturer at Royal Holloway, becoming reader in 1974 and then professor in 1978.  Worth set up a joint English and Drama degree at Royal Holloway in 1978, later introducing single honours Drama.  On her appointment as the first professor of drama at the University of London she also became the first woman in England to hold this academic title. In her teaching Worth was always committed to combining theory with theatre practice.

Worth was a distinguished expert on Modern theatre, especially Irish theatre, and a leading authority on Samuel Beckett.   Worth published many essays and books – including Samuel Beckett’s Theatre:  Life-Journeys – on Beckett.  She also produced several productions of his plays: for example, working with actor Patrick Magee Worth produced Beckett's television play Eh Joe and his radio plays, Words and Music, Embers and Cascando.  Beckett gave Worth special permission to work with these texts.  Beckett also gave Worth permission to adapt his short story Company; the award-winning production of Worth's adaptation – directed by Tim Pigott-Smith and performed by Julian Curry at the Demarco Gallery Theatre 2–29 August 1987 - received a Fringe First at the Edinburgh Festival.  It was later staged at the Belfast Festival (23-8 November 1987), the Donmar Warehouse in London (18 January - 6 February 1988, the Lehman College Center for the Performing Arts of the City University of New York (April 1988), the Princess Grace Theatre, Monaco (18 May 1991), and the 1991 Beckett Festival, Dublin. Worth also produced a double bill of Wilde's Salome and Yeats's Full Moon in March.

Retirement
Following her retirement, Worth spent a decade (1987–97) as co-editor of the Society for Theatre Research's Theatre Notebook, a journal of the history and technique of the British theatre; she also served as a visiting professor at King's College London for most of this period. In addition she held a Leverhulme Professorial Fellowship (1987–89) and served on the advisory boards of the journals Yeats Annual and Modern Drama as well as those of many others.

In 2013 several rehearsal rooms and a new theatre named after Caryl Churchill were added to Sutherland House, the Regency villa that houses Royal Holloway's drama department. The new complex was named 'The Katharine Worth Building' in Worth's honour.

On 8 May 2015, Worth's life was one of those celebrated on BBC Radio 4's obituary programme Last Word.

Personal life
In 1947 she married George Worth, with whom she had a daughter, Libby, and two sons, Christopher and Charles. She died on 28 January 2015 of a viral infection and is survived by her children, George having predeceased her.

Publications

See also 

 Words and Music (play)
 Happy Days (play)
 ... but the clouds ...
 Play (play)
 Embers

References

Selected bibliography 

Revolutions in Modern English Drama, 1973
(ed.) Beckett the Shape Changer, 1975
The Irish Drama of Europe: from Yeats to Beckett, 1978
Oscar Wilde, 1983
Maeterlinck’s Plays in Performance, 1985
Waiting for Godot and Happy Days: text and performance, 1990
Sheridan and Goldsmith, 1992
Samuel Beckett’s Theatre: life journeys, 1999
(ed.) Where There is Nothing by W.B Yeats and The Unicorn from the Stars by Yeats and Lady Gregory, 1987.

Academics of Royal Holloway, University of London
Alumni of Bedford College, London
Academics of the Royal Central School of Speech and Drama
1922 births
Drama teachers
2015 deaths
People from Newbiggin-by-the-Sea